Kathryn ("Kathy") A. Colin (born February 6, 1974) is an American sprint canoer who competed in the early to mid-2000s. She won two medals at the 2003 Pan American Games in Santo Domingo, Dominican Republic with a gold in the K-2 500 m event and a silver in the K-4 500 m event.

Colin also competed in two Summer Olympics, but was eliminated in the semifinals of each of the four events she competed.

References
Sports-Reference.com profile

1974 births
American female canoeists
Canoeists at the 2000 Summer Olympics
Canoeists at the 2004 Summer Olympics
Living people
Olympic canoeists of the United States
Sportspeople from Hawaii
Pan American Games gold medalists for the United States
Pan American Games silver medalists for the United States
Pan American Games medalists in canoeing
Canoeists at the 2003 Pan American Games
Medalists at the 2003 Pan American Games
21st-century American women